Donald Hankinson (30 May 1832 – 6 November 1877) was a 19th-century Member of Parliament from Southland, New Zealand.

He was the son of Rev. Thomas Edwards Hankinson and his wife Caroline (née Cust).

References

Members of the New Zealand House of Representatives
1832 births
1877 deaths
New Zealand MPs for South Island electorates
19th-century New Zealand politicians